Standifer Bluff is a conspicuous rock bluff, a component of the Smith Bluffs which form the northwest coast of Dustin Island, standing 10 nautical miles (18 km) west-southwest of the north tip of the island. The bluff was photographed from helicopters of the USS Burton Island and Glacier in the U.S. Navy Bellingshausen Sea Expedition, February 1960. Named by Advisory Committee on Antarctic Names (US-ACAN) for J.N. Standifer, United States Geological Survey (USGS) photographic specialist in Antarctica in the 1967–68 season.

Cliffs of Ellsworth Land